Frederick Wellington "Cyclone" Taylor, MBE (June 23, 1884 – June 9, 1979) was a Canadian professional ice hockey player and civil servant. A cover-point and rover, he played professionally from 1906 to 1922 for several teams, and is most well-known for his time with the Vancouver Millionaires of the Pacific Coast Hockey Association (PCHA). Acknowledged as one of the first stars of the professional era of hockey, Taylor was recognized during his career as one of the fastest skaters and most prolific scorers, winning five scoring championships in the PCHA. He also won the Stanley Cup twice, with Ottawa in 1909 and Vancouver in 1915, and was inducted into the Hockey Hall of Fame in 1947.

Born and raised in Southern Ontario, Taylor moved to Manitoba in 1906 to continue his hockey career. He quickly departed to play in Houghton, Michigan and spent two years in the International Hockey League, the first openly professional hockey league in the world. He returned to Canada in 1907 and joined the Ottawa Senators, spending two seasons with the team. In 1909 he signed with the Renfrew Creamery Kings, becoming the highest-paid athlete in the world on a per-game basis, before moving to Vancouver in 1912. Taylor played for the Millionaires until 1922, when his career ended.

Upon moving to Ottawa in 1907 Taylor was given a position within the federal Interior Department as an immigration clerk, and remained an immigration official for the next several decades. In 1914 Taylor was the first Canadian official to board the Komagata Maru, which was involved in a major incident relating to Canadian immigration. Taylor ultimately became the Commissioner of Immigration for British Columbia and the Yukon, the highest position in the region. In 1946 he was named a Member of the Order of the British Empire for his services as an immigration officer, retiring in 1950.

Early life
Frederick Wellington Taylor was born in Tara, Ontario, the second son and fourth of five children to Archie and Mary Taylor. The exact date of Taylor's birth is uncertain, though most sources give it as June 23, 1884. Archie, the son of Scottish immigrants, was a travelling salesman who sold farm equipment. Taylor was close to his mother, a devout Methodist, and took after her in that he never smoked, drank, or swore. Taylor claimed that he was named Frederick Wellington after a local veterinarian, a friend of his father. The Taylor family was rather poor: Archie initially made around C$50–60 a month, a low wage for the era, especially for a family with five children. To help out, Taylor left school when he was 17 and started working in a local piano factory. His earnings of around $20 a month helped to supplement his father's salary, which had risen to $75 a month.

Taylor began skating at the age of five on ponds near Tara, and learned to play hockey when he moved to Listowel. He was given his first pair of skates and was taught by a local barber named Jack Riggs, who was known in the community for his speed skating. Taylor first joined an organized team, the Listowel Mintos, in 1897 when he was 13, and spent the next five years with them. Though initially a couple of years younger than the other players, Taylor was able to keep up with them, and by the time he was sixteen he was one of the top players and leading scorers in the league. The Mintos joined the Ontario Hockey Association (OHA), the governing body of hockey in Ontario, for the 1900–01 season. They entered a local league, winning the championship as Taylor played a major role. The team reached the provincial junior championship in 1904, losing in sudden-death overtime. This greatly enhanced Taylor's name across the province, and several teams were interested in having him join them.

In October 1903 Taylor was reportedly invited by Bill Hewitt, the secretary of the OHA, to play for the Toronto Marlboros. Happy with his life in Listowel, where he had his family and job, Taylor turned down the offer. This angered Hewitt, who had expected Taylor to accept his invitation and change cities. The OHA regulated player transfers between clubs, ostensibly to keep players from moving from team to team and to preserve the ideals of amateurism. As Taylor refused to join the Marlboros, he was not allowed to play anywhere else in Ontario, and Hewitt thus banned Taylor from playing hockey in Ontario for the 1903–04 season. Taylor left Listowel in 1904 and tried to join a team in Thessalon, Ontario, but was not sanctioned to play for them. Rather than play anywhere else, he sat out the 1904–05 season.

Hockey career

Portage la Prairie and Portage Lakes (1906–1907)

Frustrated with sitting out a whole season of hockey, Taylor looked for other options for the upcoming season. The OHA only had jurisdiction in Ontario and could not ban Taylor from joining teams elsewhere, so in early January 1906 he moved west to Manitoba and joined a team in Portage la Prairie, Manitoba for the 1905–06 season. As hockey was strictly amateur in Canada at the time, Taylor was offered room, board and $25 a month in spending money to join the team. In his first game with Portage la Prairie Taylor scored two goals, impressing his opponents with his skilled play. After one match against the Kenora Thistles, the top team in the league, Taylor was offered a chance to join them as they travelled east to challenge for the Stanley Cup, the championship trophy of Canadian hockey. While considering the offer Taylor was approached by representatives from the Portage Lakes Hockey Club. A professional team based in Houghton, Michigan, Portage Lakes were members of the International Hockey League (IHL), the first openly professional hockey league. Offered US$400 to join the team, plus expenses, Taylor agreed. Taylor had previously played in Houghton in the 1902–03 season, when he had been invited to join a few friends studying dentistry there to play a series of exhibition games against local teams.

In early February, having played four games for Portage la Prairie, Taylor left the team for Houghton. Playing cover-point (an early version of a defenceman), Taylor scored eleven goals in six games for Portage Lakes as the team won the 1906 IHL championship. The following season saw Taylor score 14 goals in 23 games as Portage Lakes repeated as league champions. Taylor recalled his time in the IHL, a rough and physical league, with fondness, saying that the "league was a wonderful testing and training ground, and I was a far better player for my experience there." He also found the atmosphere nice, as "there was a different feeling there with the sport seemingly so far from its home and us all down from Canada as sort of paid mercenaries."

Offering high salaries, the IHL brought in many of the top Canadian players, who were happy to be paid to play hockey for the first time in their careers (though some had been covertly paid in Canada). In 1907 the Eastern Canada Amateur Hockey Association (ECAHA), the top league in Canada, decided to allow professional players. Many of the Canadian players took the opportunity to play in Canada, and left the IHL, which folded that summer. Taylor returned to Listowel for the summer of 1907, playing lacrosse and entertaining offers to join various hockey teams for the upcoming season. Representatives from the Quebec Bulldogs, Montreal Victorias, Montreal Wanderers, and Cobalt Silver Kings all met with Taylor. Cobalt's offer was the most interesting to Taylor largely due to their wealthy owner, rail-builder and mine-owner Michael John O'Brien, though he turned Cobalt down as the club did not offer enough money.

Ottawa Senators (1907–1909)

Taylor ended up signing with the Ottawa Senators, who played in the ECAHA (the league would drop the word "Amateur" in 1908 and become known as the ECHA). The Senators offered him $500 for the season, a salary that was high for the time but not extravagant. What attracted Taylor to Ottawa was that the club also promised him a job within the immigration branch of the federal Department of the Interior. Taylor was intrigued by the offer—the ability to have a permanent career was important, and a position in the civil service promised job security for Taylor after his hockey career ended. He thus took up a position as a junior clerk for $35 a month.

Soon after arriving in Ottawa, Taylor received offers to leave the Senators and join other teams. The Ottawa Victorias, who played in the Federal Amateur Hockey League, a rival to the ECAHA, asked Taylor to play a two-game series against the Renfrew Creamery Kings of the local Upper Ottawa Valley Hockey League, with the possibility of a full-season contract. Renfrew, owned by O'Brien, argued that Taylor was not allowed to play for the Victorias, and the Stanley Cup trustees confirmed he was not eligible. Instead Renfrew made their own proposal to Taylor for after the series ended: $1,500 for the season. They argued that as Taylor had not signed a contract with Ottawa he was free to leave the team. However representatives from the Senators met up with Taylor and confirmed the club did want him, which convinced him to return for the start of the season.

Taylor played at centre for the Senators in the first game of the season. As one of the main forwards and one of the fastest players in hockey, he was frequently called for being offside due to being too quick for his linemates and the rules at the time forbidding any forward passing. It was decided then that he would move to cover-point for the rest of the season so that he would be further back on the ice and able to better utilize his speed. Later  in the season, during a January 11, 1908 game against the Montreal Wanderers, the Earl Grey, Governor General of Canada, was reportedly in attendance. Afterwards he was allegedly overheard by Ottawa Free Press reporter Malcolm Brice saying, "That new No.4, Taylor, he's a cyclone if ever I saw one," a reference to Taylor's speed. Though previously referred to as both a "tornado" and a "whirlwind", the "Cyclone" stuck with Taylor for the rest of his career. Taylor performed well in his first season with Ottawa, scoring nine goals in eleven games and being named the best cover-point in the ECAHA. After the season ended the Senators traveled to New York City for a series of exhibition matches against the Wanderers, during which Taylor garnered the most press attention with his skills.

At the start of the 1908–09 season, Taylor signed with the Pittsburgh Athletic Club of the Western Pennsylvania Hockey League. However after three games there, the team released him and Fred Lake, accusing them of trying to undermine their management and intentionally losing a game to do so. Taylor considered offers from other teams but decided to return to Ottawa for the season, playing 11 games and scoring 9 goals. The Senators won the league championship, and as per the regulations of the era were awarded the Stanley Cup as a result.

Renfrew Creamery Kings (1909–1912)
In the lead-up to the 1909–10 season Taylor was again courted by O'Brien to join his team in Renfrew. Throughout November 1909 there were contradictory newspaper reports about the club Taylor would sign with, and both Ottawa and Renfrew claimed he had signed with them. By December 30 Taylor finalized an agreement with Renfrew. His salary was reported to be as high as $5,250 for the season, which if accurate would have made Taylor the highest-paid athlete in Canadian history. A comparison was made with Major League Baseball player Ty Cobb, who had signed around the same time for US$6,500 to play a 154-game season. Since Renfrew only had a 12-game season; Taylor was the highest-paid athlete in the world on a per-game basis.

The signing of Taylor was important for O'Brien for a different reason. He had long sought to win the Stanley Cup, and his previous efforts to challenge for it had been unsuccessful. Moreover, when the ECHA had re-constituted itself as the Canadian Hockey Association (CHA) in November 1909, O'Brien was unable to join. He thus started a new league, the National Hockey Association (NHA), which was composed of teams refused entry to the CHA and new teams O'Brien owned. By adding Taylor to the new league, the NHA gained immediate legitimacy and the CHA folded within a few weeks, at which point its remaining teams were admitted into the NHA.

Aside from the high salary, Taylor was interested in joining Renfrew because they made it known they were trying to build a strong team and were willing to pay for it. Shortly before he signed with the club, they had agreed to terms with the highly sought brothers, Lester and Frank Patrick. The Patricks had been approached by no fewer than six teams before they agreed to sign with Renfrew for $3,000 and $2,000 respectively. Other prominent players who joined the club were goaltender Bert Lindsay and forward Herb Jordan, the latter of whom was agreeing to turn professional by signing with Renfrew. The team was further bolstered mid-way through the season with the acquisition of Newsy Lalonde, one of the highest-scoring players of the era. With such a high-priced roster, the team became informally known as the "Millionaires".

Despite the high-priced talent, which included four future members of the Hockey Hall of Fame on the roster, Renfrew finished third in the NHA and thus were not able to make a challenge for the Stanley Cup, a right reserved for the league winner. Taylor performed well, finishing fourth on the team in scoring with ten goals in twelve games. During the season one of the most famous legends about Taylor developed: prior to Renfrew's first game in Ottawa against the Senators, Taylor boasted he would score a goal while skating backwards (an unusual way to skate at the time, let alone score). Despite his boast prior to the February 12, 1908 game, Taylor was held scoreless as Ottawa won 8–5. However during the next game between the two, on March 8 in Renfrew, the Creamery Kings won 17–2, and Taylor scored three times, including one where he skated backwards.

Taylor re-signed with Renfrew for the 1910–11 season, though a league-wide drop in salaries saw him earn only $1,800. Reflecting later on, Taylor said that he and the other players "knew those big first-year salaries couldn't last." The Patrick brothers had moved west to join their father to establish a lumber company in British Columbia, and Lalonde joined the rival Montreal Canadiens. A weakened Renfrew team again finished third. Taylor scored twelve goals in sixteen games to again place fourth on the team in scoring.

Renfrew disbanded prior to the 1911–12 season, and the rights to its players were dispersed to the other teams in the league. Taylor was claimed by the Wanderers, whose owner, Sam Lichtenhein, was working on a new arena and needed a star player to bolster attendance. However Taylor refused to report to the club because he was not interested in moving to or playing in Montreal, stating he would only play for Ottawa or not at all. Despite attempts by the Senators to trade for him, Taylor's rights remained with the Wanderers, leading him to sit out the season. Though he did not play, Taylor was still paid a salary of $1,200 by the Senators in hopes that he would join them for the following season, and he spent the winter playing a few games and working as a referee in the local semi-professional league. At the end of the season the NHA sent an all-star team to Vancouver to play a series of games against teams from the Pacific Coast Hockey Association (PCHA), a new professional league established by the Patricks in Western Canada. Though Taylor had not played all year, the Patricks had consented to the exhibition on the condition that Taylor would be included on the NHA team.

Vancouver Millionaires (1912–1922)

Lester and Frank Patrick had moved to Western Canada in 1907 and 1908 to work for their father Joe in the lumber company he established there. They sold the family business in 1911 and used the money from the sale to set up the PCHA, recruiting players from Eastern Canada to join the league.

After the conclusion of the 1911–12 season the Wanderers gave up trying to sign Taylor. He was offered a contract of $3,000 to join the Toronto Tecumsehs, double the salary of any other player, but turned it down because he did not like the idea of being bought and sold. Ottawa also made an offer of $1,800 for the season, but again Taylor turned it down. During the off-season Taylor had been in frequent contact with the Patricks, who encouraged him to move west and play in their league. After months of discussion, Taylor agreed to join the Vancouver Millionaires, a decision that was announced on November 20. He was given a salary of $2,200, transportation back to Ottawa, and a four-month leave of absence from his immigration job. The offer made Taylor the highest-paid player in hockey again, and was at least $500 more than anyone had earned in the PCHA the previous season. As was his style, Taylor did not sign a contract, later stating that there "never was in those days with the Patricks. It was just a verbal agreement, and we shook hands on it." Speaking after the agreement, Lester Patrick noted that they "had Fred Taylor in mind right from the beginning. His acquisition was just a matter of timing."

Much like in the NHA, Taylor's presence gave legitimacy to the PCHA. While the first games of the PCHA's inaugural season only had half the tickets sold, the Millionaires sold out their home opener for the 1912–13 season, Taylor's debut in the league. It was the first sell-out for the PCHA. Prior to that first game, against the New Westminster Royals on December 10, Taylor had severe abdominal pains and nearly missed the match. He barely made it to the game, though he ended up scoring in a 7–2 Vancouver victory. The abdominal pain turned out to be appendicitis, which left Taylor severely ill during his first season in the west. He originally wanted to wait until the season was over to have surgery, but ultimately postponed it indefinitely. Even so, he managed to play in all sixteen games for Vancouver during the season, finishing with ten goals and eight assists (the PCHA was the first league to officially keep track of assists), fourth on his team and sixth overall in the league for scoring.

The following season saw Taylor move positions to rover, a position that combined offence and defence; he would play as a rover for the remainder of his career. The change to a position that allowed for more offence helped Taylor lead the PCHA in scoring with 39 points in 16 games, and he tied with Tommy Dunderdale for the goal-scoring title with 24. Taylor repeated as the scoring leader in 1914–15, with 45 points in 16 games, and finished tied for second in goals scored with 23. Vancouver finished first in the league and thus earned the right to compete for the Stanley Cup. Starting in 1914, the Cup had been contested by the champions of the PCHA and the NHA, with each league hosting a best-of-five series in alternating years. The 1915 Final was held in Vancouver, and as the leagues used different rules, games alternated between PCHA and NHA rules. The NHA champions were the Ottawa Senators, with whom Taylor had played previously and won the Cup in 1909. They placed all their focus on trying to contain him, but to no avail. Vancouver won the first three games to win the Cup, with Taylor scoring eight goals and two assists.

Taylor repeated as PCHA scoring champion again in 1915–16 with 35 points in 18 games, finishing second for goals with 21 and tied for the lead in assists with 14. Vancouver finished second in the league and thus was unable to defend its Stanley Cup title. After the season ended Taylor announced his retirement, though this was not taken seriously by the league or his peers, and was largely ignored. True enough, he was convinced to re-join the team prior to the start of the 1916–17 season. He started the season strongly, leading the league in scoring early on, but in early December his appendicitis flared up and he was forced to miss time and have surgery to remove his appendix. Playing in 12 of the Millionaires' 23 games, Taylor finished ninth overall in league scoring with 29 points and third in assists with 15.

At full health for the 1917–18 season, Taylor appeared in 18 games and finished first in goals (32) and points (43), and was second for assists (11); he was named the most valuable player of the league. Vancouver won the PCHA championship and traveled to Toronto to play the National Hockey League (NHL) champion, the Toronto Arenas, in the 1918 Stanley Cup Finals. Though Taylor scored the most goals in the series (9) and the Millionaires outscored the Arenas (21 to 18), Toronto won the best-of-five series and the Cup. Taylor repeated as scoring champion of the PCHA in 1918–19, and for the first time led in goals (23), assists (13), and points (36). It marked the fifth and final time he led the PCHA in scoring.

After the end of the season Taylor again announced his intention to retire, though he was back for the start of the 1919–20 season. A leg injury forced him out of several games, and he only played in ten, recording twelve points and finishing far behind the scoring leaders. This contributed to a third retirement announcement, which he insisted was final. However he was coaxed out of it by Frank Patrick, who ran the Millionaires and agreed to let Taylor play only in home games and only as a replacement player throughout the during 1920–21 season. Taylor had five goals and one assist in the six games he played in, and appeared in three of the five games Vancouver played in the Stanley Cup Final against the Senators, recording one assist. Ottawa won the Cup and Taylor decided that he was retiring yet again. He sat out the 1921–22 season, but decided to attempt a return for the 1922–23 season. He appeared with Vancouver, then known as the Maroons, against the Victoria Cougars on December 8, 1922. Unable to keep pace with the game, Taylor decided after the one game to finally quit hockey.

Life outside hockey

Immigration officer
In October 1907 Taylor had joined the Immigration Branch of the Department of the Interior, a job that was arranged by the Ottawa Senators as an inducement to get Taylor to play with the club. Taylor liked the idea of a position within the federal government, seeing it as something that would ensure job security after his hockey career ended. He started out as a junior clerk, earning $35 a month. When Taylor moved to Vancouver in 1912 he initially took a leave of absence from his position. Frank Patrick would later use his close connection with Sir Richard McBride, the Premier of British Columbia, to get Taylor's position transferred west, and helped Taylor get promoted to senior immigration inspector.

By 1914 Taylor was in charge of overseeing traffic into the port of Vancouver, boarding ships and checking crew and passenger manifests. It was in this capacity that Taylor was involved in the Komagata Maru incident. The Komagata Maru was a steamship that carried 376 Sikh, Muslim, and Hindu immigrants from India in an attempt to circumvent the restrictive Canadian immigration laws which had been set up to keep non-Europeans from entering. The ship reached Vancouver on May 23, 1914 and Taylor was the first immigration officer to board the ship. Taylor spent considerable time on the ship as it sat in the Vancouver harbour. With the passengers unable to disembark and not given additional supplies, Taylor took on the role of supervising everyone until it left again for India on July 23, the passengers having been refused entry into Canada. Reflecting on the incident later in life, Taylor said that "[i]t was a terrible affair, and nobody was proud of it."

When the First World War broke out in August 1914, Taylor enlisted in the Canadian Army. Though reluctant to go overseas, he wanted to help out and was willing to do whatever was necessary. Shortly after his enlistment, it was announced that immigration officials were deemed a vital job and exempt from service. As a result, Taylor was discharged from the military and spent the war working in Vancouver.

After he retired from hockey, Taylor kept his immigration post and eventually rose to become the Commissioner of Immigration for British Columbia and the Yukon, the top position in the region. In 1946 Taylor was named as a Member of the Order of the British Empire for outstanding service to the country and community as an immigration officer in two wars. He retired from the civil service in 1950.

Later career
Taylor remained involved in hockey after his playing career ended. He was the inaugural president of the Pacific Coast Hockey League, serving from 1936 to 1940. In 1970 he dropped the puck in the ceremonial face-off that preceded the Vancouver Canucks' first home game when the team joined the NHL. A season-ticket holder, Taylor was a fixture at Canucks games until his death.

As a member of the B.C. Progressive Conservative party, Taylor unsuccessfully ran for election in the Vancouver Centre riding in the 1952 British Columbia general election, finishing fourth out of six candidates. He ran again in Vancouver Centre in the 1953 British Columbia general election, where he had 1,007 votes for 5.27% of the ballots, and again finished fourth of six candidates. In 1952 he was elected to one term as a member of the Vancouver Park Board.

Personal life
Raised a Methodist, Taylor never drank alcohol, smoked cigarettes, or cursed, which was unusual for hockey players. He attributed these values to his mother's religious devotion. His family were staunch supporters of the federal Conservative Party, which caused some concerns when Taylor was offered a position in the federal government upon his move to Ottawa; many federal jobs were patronage appointments, and with the Liberal Party in power at the time it was unusual for a Conservative supporter to be given such a position. In the summer of 1908 Taylor helped found Scout troop No.7 in Ottawa, starting a lifelong involvement with the Scouting movement. In Vancouver he continued this work, and took on an active role with the YMCA. Known for his "way with words" and "admired for his easy, courtly manner," Taylor also was known to be well-dressed throughout his playing career, and continued to maintain this style in later life. Taylor is also reported to have been a Freemason.

Taylor enjoyed sports other than hockey, and played lacrosse during the summers of his hockey career. While in Ottawa during the summer of 1908, he joined the Ottawa Capitals of the National Lacrosse Union. Taylor was seen as a good lacrosse player, though his biographer Eric Whitehead has suggested that Taylor's abilities may have been embellished by reporters due to his hockey fame. Overall, his time with the Capitals was uneventful except for an incident during a game on June 27, 1908. Taylor got into a fight with a player and accidentally punched the referee, Tom Carlind, during the scuffle. Police immediately arrested Taylor and jailed him for several hours, until Carlind arrived and explained it was unintentional. League officials considered banning Taylor over the incident, but because he drew large crowds, they let him play for the rest of the season. In 1914 he joined the Vancouver Terminals, playing for $50 per game.

Marriage and family
In February 1908 Taylor met Thirza Cook. A hockey fan, she worked as a secretary in the Immigration Department, and met Taylor there after watching him play the previous night. After their first date Taylor met Cook's widowed mother, who was from a well-off family and related by marriage to John Rudolphus Booth, an Ottawa lumber tycoon. Cook's mother was not impressed with Taylor, as his background was of a lower social standing than her own, and did not like the idea of her daughter being with a hockey player. This feeling was shared by Cook's six siblings. Despite this animosity, Taylor resolved to win the family over and decided he would save $10,000 to prove his worth. Earning a combined $2,800 from his two jobs at the time, Taylor needed six years to reach his goal. While playing in Renfrew, Taylor took a train to Ottawa several times per week to visit Cook. When he moved to Vancouver in 1912 he promised he would return for the spring and summer of 1913, initially planning for a wedding that autumn. Taylor and Cook were married on March 19, 1914 at her Ottawa home, with Frank Patrick serving as the best man. They went to New York on their honeymoon, where Taylor joined the Millionaires in an exhibition series. The couple moved to Vancouver after the series ended, spending the rest of their lives there. Thirza died in March 1963, from heart troubles.

Taylor had five children: three sons and two daughters. John, the second oldest child, also played hockey and won two Canadian university championships while attending the University of Toronto. Offered a contract by the Toronto Maple Leafs of the NHL, he turned it down on advice of his father and instead earned a law degree. John worked in immigration law before entering politics and was elected to the House of Commons in 1957, representing Vancouver—Burrard until his defeat in the 1962 election. Taylor's oldest son, Fred Jr., opened a chain of sporting-goods stores and named them Cyclone Taylor Sports after his father. A grandson, Mark Taylor, played in the NHL from 1981 to 1986 with the Philadelphia Flyers, Pittsburgh Penguins and Washington Capitals. Joan, Taylor's youngest child, predeceased him, dying in 1976 from heart problems brought on from her figure skating career. After breaking his hip in 1978, Taylor's health deteriorated and he died in his sleep in Vancouver on June 9, 1979.

Legacy
Taylor was regarded as one of the best hockey players throughout his playing career, and is considered the first star of the professional era. In 1908 when he went to play in Pittsburgh, it was noted in the Pittsburgh Press how he was "in a position to get almost anything he asked for the coming season and there were lots of bidders," and that his signing in Pittsburgh was a great achievement for the team. Likewise, when he left Ottawa in 1912 and moved to Vancouver, the Ottawa Citizen said he was "the greatest drawing card in the game" and that the Senators should have increased their salary offer to him. Taylor was of average size for a hockey player of his era and he was known more for speed and creativity than for his physical prowess. He was highly sought by teams as his presence led to higher ticket sales. In an era when players only signed on for one season at a time, Taylor always had several teams interested in his services, and thus was able to command some of the highest salaries of his time.

In 1947 Taylor was elected into the Hockey Hall of Fame, and he was later inducted into the Canadian Sports Hall of Fame and the British Columbia Sports Hall of Fame. When the Hockey Hall of Fame started construction on a new building in 1961, Taylor was given the honour of turning the sod. There are several awards named after Taylor. The Vancouver Canucks team award for most valuable player is named the Cyclone Taylor Trophy. Since 1966 the Cyclone Taylor Cup has been awarded to the champion of a tournament between the winners of the British Columbia Junior B leagues. The junior Listowel Cyclones, based in Taylor's hometown, are named after him.

Career statistics

Regular season and playoffs

Source: Total Hockey

References

Notes

Citations

Bibliography

External links

 

1884 births
1979 deaths
British Columbia Conservative Party politicians
Canadian Freemasons
Canadian ice hockey defencemen
Canadian lacrosse players
Canadian Members of the Order of the British Empire
Canadian Methodists
Canadian people of Scottish descent
Canadian sportsperson-politicians
Candidates in British Columbia provincial elections
Hockey Hall of Fame inductees
Ice hockey people from Ontario
Ottawa Senators (NHA) players
Ottawa Senators (original) players
People from Bruce County
Pittsburgh Athletic Club (ice hockey) players
Portage Lakes Hockey Club players
Renfrew Hockey Club players
Scouting and Guiding in Canada
Stanley Cup champions
Vancouver Maroons players
Vancouver Millionaires players